Danilo Emanuel Lerda (born 30 March 1987) is an Argentine footballer who plays as a goalkeeper for Deportivo Maldonado.

Career
Born in Arias, Córdoba, Lerda spent most of his career playing in Uruguay. In 2004, he was caught by Uruguayan football agent Jorge Chijane in Rosario and was sent to play in the youth levels of Fénix.

In January 2012, he signed a new contract with Uruguayan giants Peñarol. He did not have much continuity on the first team due to some game mistakes. He was a reserve during his spell with Penarol, and Lerda was on the substitute's bench as the club won the 2012–13 Uruguayan Primera División season title.

In July 2014, he was transferred to his native city club Talleres de Córdoba to play in the Torneo Argentino A.

On 24 July 2015, he signed a new deal with Segunda Liga side Atlético CP.

Since 2017, Lerda has played for Deportivo Maldonado.

References

External links
 

1987 births
Living people
Footballers from Córdoba, Argentina
Argentine footballers
Argentine expatriate footballers
Association football goalkeepers
Centro Atlético Fénix players
Peñarol players
Talleres de Córdoba footballers
Atlético Clube de Portugal players
Danubio F.C. players
Deportivo Maldonado players
Uruguayan Segunda División players
Uruguayan Primera División players
Liga Portugal 2 players
Argentine expatriate sportspeople in Portugal
Argentine expatriate sportspeople in Uruguay
Expatriate footballers in Portugal
Expatriate footballers in Uruguay